Sacasa is a surname. Notable people with the name include:

 Benjamín Lacayo Sacasa (1893–1959), President of Nicaragua
 Guillermo Sevilla Sacasa (1908–1997), Nicaraguan ambassador to the United States
 Juan Bautista Sacasa (1874–1946), President of Nicaragua
 Olga Sacasa (born 1961), Nicaraguan track and road cyclist
 Roberto Sacasa (1840–1896), President of Nicaragua
 Roberto Aguirre-Sacasa (born 1973), American playwright, screenwriter, and comic book writer

See also
 Anselmo Sacasas (1912–1998), Cuban jazz pianist, bandleader, composer, and arranger

Spanish-language surnames